Pteronarcys pictetii, the midwestern salmonfly, is a species of giant stonefly in the family Pteronarcyidae. It is found in North America.

References

External links

 

Plecoptera
Articles created by Qbugbot
Insects described in 1873